Gei (Chinese: 給; pinyin: gĕi) is the sixth studio album by Taiwanese singer and songwriter Lala Hsu, released by AsiaMuse on 22 June 2022. Hsu and Howe Chen served as the album's producers, with David Ke as production coordinator. The album is released four and a half years after her fifth studio album The Inner Me (2017), followed by her marriage and childbirth. Hsu explored genres such as dance, retro, and disco, breaking her previous albums' style with usual slow-tempo ballads.

At the 33rd Golden Melody Awards, Hsu received three nominations including Song of the Year and was awarded the Best Single Producer with Chen for her single "None of the Above".

Track listing

Music videos

Awards and nominations

References 

2022 albums
Lala Hsu albums